Nipponaphera tuba is a species of sea snail, a marine gastropod mollusk in the family Cancellariidae, the nutmeg snails.

Description
The length of the shell attains 20.7 mm.

Distribution
This marine species occurs off Vanuatu.

References

teramachii
Gastropods described in 2008